WWGY (99.3 FM, "Froggy 99.3") is a country music formatted radio station licensed to Fulton, Kentucky, serving Union City, Tennessee, Fulton, Kentucky and Martin, Tennessee. The station is owned and operated by Forever Media, through licensee Forever South Licenses, LLC. The syndicated Ace & TJ Show is carried weekday mornings.

On February 3, 2020, WWGY changed their format from top 40/CHR to country, branded as "Froggy 94.3 & 99.3.".

On December 30, 2020, WWGY dropped their broadcast on WTJF-FM and rebranded on-air as "99.3 Northwest TN's Froggy", dropping the mention of 94.3.

Previous logo

References

External links
 
 

WGY (FM)
WGY
Radio stations established in 1953
1953 establishments in Kentucky